Derek Westerman is an American screenwriter, film director, and film producer born and raised in Toledo, Ohio. His debut work was the independent web comedy series Bad Dads, a series of five, three-minute shorts featuring Michael Cera and Will Hines, which premiered on the website CollegeHumor during its 2011 Spring Season of original web shows. Bad Dads premiered at the Dallas International Film Festival, Palm Springs International Festival of Short Films, L.A. Comedy Shorts Film Festival, and was featured at the 2011 Just for Laughs comedy festival in Chicago, Illinois and Montreal, Quebec.

Westerman has worked with many comedians of Upright Citizens Brigade and wrote sketch comedy with Michael Cera while he was involved in the filming of Arrested Development. His senior thesis film from Loyola Marymount University starred Clark Duke alongside Michael Cera. He attended film school at Loyola Marymount University from 2002 to 2006 in Los Angeles, California and received his master's degree in Visual Culture Theory in 2010 from NYU. In 2019, Westerman partnered with screenwriter Yolanda Ruiz to create Ruiz Westerman Screenwriting Services. He currently lives in Los Angeles, California.

References

External links
 Toledo.com, "Michael Cera's Shorts: Toledo's Derek Westerman Aims High" by Ryan A Bunch
 Slashfilm "VOTD: 'Bad Dads' Starring Michael Cera and Will Hines" by Peter Sciretta, March 10, 2011
 "Bad Dads director returning home for screening" by Emilly Gibb, Toledo Free Press, April 7, 2011
 "Area filmmaker works with Michael Cera" by Jeff McGinnis, Toledo Free Press, Mar 4, 2011
 College Humor "Bad Dads" Stream Episodes

 Exclusive Interview with Director Derek Westerman, Pearl Snap Discount
 "Palm Springs International ShortFest sets program" by Variety Newsroom, Jun 8, 2011
 - "Ohio native goes 'Bad'" by Nick Chordas, Columbus Dispatch, March 2, 2011

American male screenwriters
Writers from Toledo, Ohio
Living people
Film directors from Ohio
Year of birth missing (living people)
Screenwriters from Ohio